Farner is an unincorporated community in Polk County, Tennessee, United States. Farner has a post office with ZIP code 37333. The Hiwassee River and Apalachia Dam are located just to the north.

Demographics

References

Unincorporated communities in Polk County, Tennessee
Unincorporated communities in Tennessee
Populated places on the Hiwassee River